Social analytics is a philosophical perspective developed since the early 1980s by the Danish idea historian and philosopher Lars-Henrik Schmidt. The theoretical object of the perspective is socius, a kind of "commonness" that is neither a universal account nor a communality shared by every member of a body. Thus, Social Analytics differs from traditional philosophy as well as sociology. It might be said that the perspective attempts to articulate the contentions between philosophy and sociology. The practise of Social Analytics is to report on tendencies of the times. It does not aim to make a diagnosis of the times that can be agreed upon by everyone or anybody but a report that no one wants to protest about.

References

Philosophical schools and traditions
Sociological terminology